Recep Aydın (born 27 January 1990) is a Turkish footballer who plays as a midfielder for Bodrumspor.

External links
 
 
 

1990 births
Sportspeople from Çanakkale
Living people
Turkish footballers
Association football midfielders
Konyaspor footballers
İstanbulspor footballers
İnegölspor footballers
Kardemir Karabükspor footballers
Giresunspor footballers
Ümraniyespor footballers
Bursaspor footballers
Altınordu F.K. players
Süper Lig players
TFF First League players